is a Japanese photographer.

References

Japanese photographers
1935 births
Living people
Place of birth missing (living people)
Date of birth missing (living people)
20th-century Japanese photographers